Fourteen competitors from the United States competed in three sports at the 1896 Summer Olympics in Athens, Greece.  The Americans were the most successful athletes in terms of gold medals, beating host nation Greece, 11 to 10, despite fielding only 14 competitors compared to an estimated 169 Greek entrants.  However, the Greeks' 46 total medals dwarfed the Americans' 20.

The United States team had 27 entries in 16 events, with 20 of the 27 resulting in top-three finishes.

Most of the American competitors were students at Harvard University or Princeton University or members of the Boston Athletic Association. The team trained at The Pennington School, in Pennington, New Jersey, while preparing for the first modern Olympic Games.

Medalists

Of the 14 Americans at the Athens Games, 12 won medals.  Charles Waldstein, a shooter, and Gardner Williams, a swimmer, were the two who did not win any medals.

Multiple medalists
The following competitors won multiple medals at the 1896 Olympic Games.

Competitors

| width=78% align=left valign=top |
The following is the list of number of competitors in the Games.

| width="22%" align="left" valign="top" |

Athletics

The United States squad of 11, which featured only one national champion, won nine gold medals in the twelve athletics events, with contributions from six different athletes. Six silver medals and two bronze medals also went to the Americans in athletics.

Track & road events

Field events

Cycling

Road

Fencing

Shooting

The Paine brothers contested only two events, taking the top two spots in the event in which they both competed, the military pistol. Sumner was the only one of the two to enter the free pistol, which he won.  Waldstein was the third member of the American shooting contingent, competing in the military rifle event.

Swimming

Williams competed in two swimming events, with his results currently unknown.

References

 
  (Excerpt available at )
 

Nations at the 1896 Summer Olympics
1896
Olympics